Meher Afroze Chumki (born 1 November 1959) is a Bangladeshi politician. She was the State Minister for Women and Children Affairs. She is the incumbent president of Bangladesh Mohila Awami League at the Sixth National Council held in December 2022.

Early life and education
Chumki was born on 1 November 1959 to Moyez Uddin. Her father, Moyez Uddin, was a member of parliament who was assassinated in 1984. She completed her bachelor's degree in botany from the University of Dhaka.

Career 
Between 1996 and 2001, Chumki served in Parliament in the reserved seats for women. She represented the Gazipur-5 constituency. In 2009, she was elected to the Parliament and in 2013, was sworn in as State Minister for Women and Children Affairs.

Chumki won the Anannya Shirshodosh award in September 2015.

Awards
 Anannya Top Ten Awards (2014)

References 

1959 births
Living people
People from Gazipur District
University of Dhaka alumni
Women government ministers of Bangladesh
Women members of the Jatiya Sangsad
20th-century Bangladeshi women politicians
21st-century Bangladeshi women politicians
10th Jatiya Sangsad members
State Ministers of Women and Children Affairs (Bangladesh)
11th Jatiya Sangsad members